The Brazilian skate (Rajella sadowskii) is a species of fish in the family Rajidae. It is found in Brazil and Chile. Its natural habitat is open seas. It is not well known but is thought to be threatened by bycatch of Patagonian toothfish.

References

Rajella
Taxonomy articles created by Polbot
Taxa named by Matthias Stehmann
Fish described in 1974
Rajidae